Leake Central High School is a public school located at 704 Jordan Street in Carthage, Mississippi, United States. It is part of the Leake County School District. The school is currently rated Category 4.

History 
Leake Central High School serves students enrolled in grades 9-12 and was built in 1961. W.C. Oliver was the Superintendent. Hicks and McMullan of Jackson designed the school. Webster Construction Company of Meridian built CHS. Carthage High School along with Edinburg Attendance Center and Thomastown Attendance Center were consolidated for the 2011–2012 school year following a court order from the Department of Justice. The school was renamed Leake Central High School.  The mascot and colors were selected by the students.  The gator was named the mascot and the school's colors became orange, black, and white.

References

External links

 Public high schools in Mississippi
 Schools in Leake County, Mississippi